Gingicithara ponderosa is a species of sea snail, a marine gastropod mollusk in the family Mangeliidae.

Description
The shell of the adult snail varies between 12 mm and 20 mm.

The shell is numerously narrowly and delicately longitudinally ribbed and is latticed by revolving striae. The shell is yellowish white, interruptedly narrowly brown-banded at the slight shoulder, and occasionally
tinged with brown elsewhere.

Distribution
This marine species occurs off the Philippines.

References

 Reeve, L.A. 1846. Monograph of the genus Mangelia. pls 1–8 in Reeve, L.A. (ed). Conchologia Iconica. London : L. Reeve & Co. Vol. 3.

External links
  Tucker, J.K. 2004 Catalog of recent and fossil turrids (Mollusca: Gastropoda). Zootaxa 682:1-1295.
 Kilburn R.N. 1992. Turridae (Mollusca: Gastropoda) of southern Africa and Mozambique. Part 6. Subfamily Mangeliinae, section 1. Annals of the Natal Museum, 33: 461–575
 

ponderosa
Gastropods described in 1846